Tillamook National Forest was established by the U.S. Forest Service in Oregon on March 2, 1907 with . On July 1, 1908, Executive Order 860 assigned a portion to Umpqua National Forest to establish Siuslaw National Forest and the remainder was returned to the public domain. The name was discontinued.

References

External links
Forest History Society
Listing of the National Forests of the United States and Their Dates (from Forest History Society website) Text from Davis, Richard C., ed. Encyclopedia of American Forest and Conservation History. New York: Macmillan Publishing Company for the Forest History Society, 1983. Vol. II, pp. 743-788.

Former National Forests of Oregon
1907 establishments in Oregon
Protected areas established in 1907
1908 disestablishments in Oregon